The railways in Albania are administered by the national railway company Hekurudha Shqiptare (HSH) (Albanian: Albanian Railways). It operates a standard-gauge railway gauge rail system in Albania. All trains are hauled by Czechoslovak-built ČKD diesel-electric locomotives.

The small system, now mostly closed,  was considered by many travel guides as a tourist attraction and de facto a panoramic train journey, however the railway from Elbasan to Pogradec, the most beautiful part of railway, was closed in 2012 due to the poor condition of the line and the structures along it. The Section of the Shkoder - Vora line south of Lac is closed. The tracks on the Tirana - Durres line have been removed.

There is only one international link, with Montenegro, the Podgorica–Shkodër railway, which has only ever been used for freight traffic, and whose last station in Albania is the Bajzë Rail Station.

History

Before 1947, Albania was the only country in Europe not to have a standard rail service, although some narrow (decauville) gauge lines were built during World War I. In 1947, Albania's first standard gauge line was opened between Durrës and Peqin, measuring 44 km. This was soon followed by the Durrës-Tirana line in 1948.

The railway system was extensively promoted by the government of Enver Hoxha, during which time the use of private motor transport was effectively prohibited. By 1987, 677 km of track was constructed, linking the main urban and industrial centres. Train transport was the main transportation method until the collapse of Communism in 1990.

After 1991, the railway network fell into disrepair. Since 1991, there was a considerable increase in car ownership and bus usage. Whilst some of the country's secondary roads are still in a very poor condition, there have been other developments (such as the construction of a motorway between Tirana, Durrës, and other towns) which have taken much traffic away from the railways.

As of 2015, some stations and rolling stock along the Durrës–Tiranë railway line was being renovated and coloured red and white.

Timeline

November 1947 - Opening of the first standard gauge railway line (Durrës to Peqin).
June 1957 - Introduction of diesel-electric locomotives.
July 1973 - Completion of the railway line from Elbasan to Prrenjas, the first Albanian line through the mountains.
September 1986 - First international rail freight (to and from Montenegro, then part of Yugoslavia).
2000 - HSH ceases to be a state enterprise, becoming a limited company (although state owned).
2005 - Other rail operators allowed track access.
2020 - Most of the network closed
2021-All the trains in the country suspended

Present day network

The HSH passenger system is virtually defunct. As of August 2022 the only service operating is between Durrës and Elbasan (one return trip on weekends only).

 
The rails from the line Milot–Rubik–Rrëshen have been partially removed to repair the line to Montenegro. The line should have led to the Nuclear Power Plant of Klos, but was never finished.
Durres–Kashar line. For a while, from 2015, services to Durrës operated from Kashar (7 km outside Tirane city centre) when Tirana station was demolished to make way for a new boulevard. This no longer operates and the track has been lifted. In 2021 Albanian State Railways has signed a contract with Italian company INC for the rehabilitation of the Durrës-Tirana railway line and the construction of a new line out to Mother Teresa Airport.

The Librazhd-Pogradec line, was closed for passenger traffic in 2012. The stored locomotives and wagons from Prrenjas were moved to Elbasan. Though the newly built Elbasan-Podgradec highway incorporated bridges over the railway track, thus leaving open the possibility of their eventual reopening, it is unlikely that services to Elbasan and beyond will resume. 

There may be some freight-only branch lines. Occasional freight trains may still run between Podgorica and Shkodër and between Durrës and the oil refinery at Ballsh about once a week. The Tirana-Shkodër and the Durrës-Elbasan lines are closed. Rehabilitation of the Fier-Vlore mainline is currently being carried out by Fier-Vlora Railway, and immediately south of Fier a number of short spurs to industrial areas have been relaid.

The UIC Country Code for the Albanian railway system is 41.

In 2019 5 trains per day ran on the network. 1 train Kashar - Elbasan, 2 trains Durres - Shkoder and 2 trains Durres - Elbasan. In the Spring of 2022 the stretch between Shkodër and Lac of the original Shkodër–Vorë railway was served once weekly on Tuesday.

According to the timetable for 2022 the only connection in operation was Durres to Elbasan on weekends only.

Future

Tirana-Durrës line 
It was announced that the Tirana-Durrës line would be rehabilitated with a loan of €35.9 million from the European Bank for Reconstruction and Development and a €35.5 million grant from the Western Balkans Investment Fund. The grants would also fund the construction of the Tirana-Rinas Line. The lines will come complete with level crossings and signals to improve safety and reliability. Construction works started in 2021.

Durrës-Rrogozhinë-Elbasan-Progradec line 
On 9 October 2018, the Feasibility Study for rehabilitation of the Durrës-Rrogozhinë-Elbasan-Pogradec railway line was presented, funded by European Commission funds, made available through the Western Balkans Investment Instrument. A pre-feasibility assessment was completed for the  Durrës to Pogradec line. The focus was on the  line between Durrës, Rrogozhinës and Elbasan. The remaining  from Elbasan in Pogradec is out of service due to the poor condition of the line and the bridges and tunnels along it. The Durrës Segreg-Rrogozhinë segment was rated the highest priority for rehabilitation. The focus of investment will be the  section from Durrës - Rrogozhinë. Travel time will be reduced from 60 min to 32 min. The flow along this segment is expected to reach 330,000 passengers and 1,100,000 tons of goods by 2047. Estimated value in time saving for users of the Albanian transport system will be 0.65 million euros for travelers and 15.3 million euros for freight transport. Additional savings from the reduction in the cost of operating vehicles in road transport are estimated at EUR 0.5 million for travelers and EUR 8.7 million for freight transport.

Durrës-Pristina line 
Albania and Kosovo signed a memorandum of understanding (MoU) paving the way for the construction of a railway line that will link the Adriatic port of Durres to Pristina, Kosovo. 

On 20 June 2022 both governments signed another agreement to build the railway track connecting Durrës and Pristina. The memorandum covers the feasibility study for the project that is expected to cost some €1.98 million. Of these, Albania will contribute €1 million and Kosovo 980,000.

Progradec-Krystallopigi line 
It was announced that a Albania-Greece line is underway. The construction of a new railway line with a total length of about 130 km is underway and will connect Greece with Albania. The railway line will connect between Greece and Albania, through Florina-Krystallopigi-Pogradec.

Pan-European Corridor VIII 
Albania, Bulgaria and North Macedonia have signed on 19 October 2021 an agreement  to complete Pan-European Corridor VIII.

North Macedonia seeks funding for rail link with Albania.

Statistics
Usage of the railway network of Albania is declining year by year.

Rail links to adjacent countries 
Neighbouring railways have the same gauge.
  Montenegro - freight only
  Greece - planned
  North Macedonia - no connection
  Kosovo - planned

See also

Hekurudha Shqiptare
Transport in Albania

References

External links

 HSH Official Website
 Timetable of Albanian trains
 — A site maintained by and for railway enthusiasts with an interest in Albanian Railways.
 Albanian railways in photos
 Photo gallery dedicated to HSH on World of Railways.
 Albania's long-suffering railways, The Economist, 2010.